Chabutra Khas better known as Chabutra is a village located in Tira Sujanpur tehsil of Hamirpur district, Himachal Pradesh, India. It is situated 12.4 km away from district headquarter and 11.6 km away from Tehsil Tira Sujanpur. The village is located overlooking Beas river flowing below in the valley. The PIN code of the village is 177007. Chabutra Khas population in 2011 is between 1,051 and 1,201 and total households residing are 237. The village's high School is Government Senior Secondary School, which was founded in 1943.

References

Villages in Hamirpur district, Himachal Pradesh